Classica HD is an Italian television channel devoted to classical music, opera, ballet and jazz. It broadcasts concerts, documentaries and interviews for 20 hours a day on Sky Italia. From 2013 the channel has only been available in High definition on basic package. Classica had been owned by Vivendi up until the switch to HDTV format when was taken up by Unitel in Germany.

See also
 Stingray Classica

External links
 Official website (in Italian)

Classical music television channels
Television channels in Italy
Italian-language television stations
Television channels and stations established in 1997
Music organisations based in Italy